Christopher O'Fearghila was appointed Dean of Armagh in 1334.  He died in 1362.

References

Deans of Armagh
14th-century Irish Roman Catholic priests